Rabenberg is a mountain of Saxony, southeastern Germany.

Mountains of Saxony
Mountains of the Ore Mountains